Barley malt syrup is an unrefined sweetener, processed by extraction from sprouted, malted, barley.

Barley malt syrup contains approximately 65 percent maltose, 30 percent complex carbohydrates, and 3 percent storage protein (prolamin glycoprotein). Malt syrup is dark brown, thick, sticky, and possesses a strong distinctive flavor described as "malty". It is about half as sweet as refined white sugar. Barley malt syrup is sometimes used in combination with other natural sweeteners to lend a malt flavor. Also called "barley malt extract" (or just malt syrup), barley malt syrup is made from malted barley, though there are instances of mislabeling where merchants use other grains or corn syrup in production. 

Barley malt syrup is also sold in powdered form. Barley malt extract is used in the bread and baked good industry for browning and flavoring, and in cereal manufacture to add malt flavor. Adding barley malt syrup to yeast dough increases fermentation as a result of the enzymes in the malt, thus quickening the proofing process.

Barley malt syrup has a long history, and was one of the primary sweeteners (along with honey) in use in China in the years 1000 BCE – 1000 CE. Qimin Yaoshu, a classic 6th century Chinese text, contains notes on the extraction of malt syrup and maltose from common household grains. Barley malt syrup continues to be used in traditional Chinese sweets, such as Chinese cotton candy.

Sugar rationing in the US led to the first commercial malt syrup production in the 1920s, to deal with sugar shortages.

Malt loaf is another product that makes use of barley malt syrup.

See also
 Brewing
 List of syrups
 List of unrefined sweeteners
Malted milk

References

External links

Malt syrup
Syrup
Malt